Urban studies is the diverse range of disciplines and approaches to the study of all aspects of cities, their suburbs, and other urban areas. This includes among others: urban economics, urban planning, urban ecology, urban transportation systems, urban politics, sociology and urban social relations. This can be contrasted with the study of rural areas and rural lifestyles.

A 
 architecture
 arcology
 allotment (gardening)
 Automobile dependency
 autonomous building

B 
 Bat-Yam International Biennale of Landscape Urbanism
 Beijing Planning Exhibition Hall
 bicycle-friendly
 built environment

C 
 car-free zone
 car-pool lane
 Central business district
 city
 City limits
 community
 community currency
 community emergency response team
 commuting
 Council on Tall Buildings and Urban Habitat
 congestion charge
 consumerism
 co-housing
 cultural diversity

E 
 eco-industrial park
 eco-village
 ecological health
 ecological footprint
 ecological sanitation
 ecology
 economies of agglomeration
 education
 electricity generation
 energy
 environmental health
 environmental studies
 externality

F 
 farmers market
 flash mob

G 
 gentrification
 Global city 
 Grand Paris

H 

 Hudson's village model
 human development theory

I 
 infrastructural capital
 industrial ecology

J 
 juvenile justice

L 
 land ethic
 landscape architecture
 Larger Urban Zones

M 
 mass transit 
 Moscow Urban Forum 
 Museums 
 Music

N 
 neighborhood 
 Neighbourhood character
 New pedestrianism
 New urbanism

O 
 Overcrowding

P 
 pedestrian-friendly
 pedestrian overpass
 pedestrian underpass
 personal rapid transit
 Place
 Place identity
 Placemaking
Planetizen
 planned cities
 political economy
 productivism
 Public space
 public transport
 Principles of Intelligent Urbanism

R 
 Radical planning
 recycling
 redlining
 Regional planning
 rural

S 
 schools
 service economy
 seven-generation sustainability
 sewage system
 Shanghai Urban Planning Exhibition Center
 shared space
 shift-share
 smog
 Sociology
 soft energy
 street reclaiming
 suburban
 suburban colonization

T 
 traffic calming
 toll bridge
 toll road
 terrorism
 Times Square Red, Times Square Blue
 transit-oriented development

U 
 urbanization
 urban agriculture
 urban anthropology
 urban area
 urban car
 urban culture
 urban decay
 urban design
 urban ecology
 urban exploration
 Urban forest
 Urban forestry
 urban geography
 urban history
 Urban Land Institute
 urban outdoorsman
 urban planner
 urban planning
 Urban planning in ancient China
 Urban planning in ancient Egypt
 Urban planning in communist countries
 urban primacy
 Urban reforestation
 urban renewal
 urban secession
 urban sociology
 Urban space
 urban sprawl
 Urban Tourism
 urban tribe
 urban wilderness
 urbicide
 unemployment
 urbanomics

V 
 Violence

W 
 Welthauptstadt Germania
 white flight
 World Planners Congress

Z 
zoning

Related lists 
 List of city squares
 List of city squares by size
 list of urban planning topics
 index of urban sociology articles
 list of planned cities
 list of urban planners
 list of ecology topics
 list of environment topics
 list of ethics topics
 list of economics topics
 list of architecture topics
 list of political science topics

See also
 ABCD Region: An industrial region made up of seven municipalities with the greater metropolitan area of São Paulo, Brazil

External links
 

Urban studies

Urban studies topics